The following lists events that happened during 1811 in Chile.

Incumbents
President of the First Government Junta of Chile (1810): Mateo de Toro Zambrano (-February 26, Juan Martínez de Rozas (February 26-April 2), Fernando Márquez de la Plata (April 2-July 4)

President of the First National Congress:  Juan Antonio Ovalle (July 4–20), Moderate, Martin Calvo Encalada (July 20-August 11)

President of the Provisional Executive Authority: Martín Calvo Encalad,  (20 July-4 September), Patriot

President of the Executive Court: Juan Enrique Rosales (4 September–November 16)

President of the Provisional Government Junta: José Miguel Carrera (16 November–December 13), Patriot

Supreme Provisional Authority: José Miguel Carrera (December 13-), Patriot

Events

April
1 April - The Figueroa mutiny, a failed attempt to restore royalism, occurs.

July
4 July - The National Congress of Chile is established.

Births
 Date unknown - José Manuel Eguiguren Urrejola (d. 1883)

Deaths
26 February - Mateo de Toro Zambrano (b. 1727)
8 April - José Antonio Martínez de Aldunate (b. 1731)

References